The flag of Uganda (Ugandan Languages: Bendera ya Uganda) was adopted on 9 October 1962, the date that Uganda became independent from the British Empire. It consists of six equal horizontal bands of black (top), yellow, red, black, yellow, and red (bottom); a white disc is superimposed at the centre and depicts the national symbol, a grey crowned crane, facing the hoist's side.

During the colonial era the British used a British Blue ensign defaced with the colonial badge, as prescribed in 1865 regulations. Buganda, the largest of the traditional kingdoms in the colony of Uganda, had its own flag. However, in order to avoid appearing to give preference to one region of the colony over any other, the British colonial authorities selected the crane emblem for use on the Blue ensign and other official banners.

History
When the Democratic Party ruled the country, a design for flag was proposed. It had vertical stripes of green-blue-green, separated by narrower yellow stripes, and in the centre had the silhouette of a yellow crane. After the party lost the national elections on 25 April 1962 the newly elected Uganda People's Congress (UPC) rejected the former design and instead proposed the current design. It was based on the flag of UPC – a tricolour having horizontal strips of red, yellow and black. The British administration gave their approval to this  before the country's independence. The flag was designed by C Todd, Professor of Fine Art at Makerere University. He also designed the Uganda Coat of Arms and various ceremonial items, which he registered with the College of Arms, in London.

Symbolism
The three colours are representative of native ethnic groups of Africa (black), Africa's sunshine (yellow), and African brotherhood (red being the colour of blood, through which all Africans are connected).  The grey crowned crane is fabled for its gentle nature and was also the military badge of Ugandan soldiers during British rule. The raised leg of the crane symbolises the forward movement of the country.

Other flags

Military flags

References

Flag
Flags of Africa
Uganda
National flags
Flags displaying animals